Three into Two Won't Go is a 1969 British drama film directed by Peter Hall and starring Rod Steiger, Claire Bloom and Judy Geeson. The film was entered into the 19th Berlin International Film Festival.

Plot
Steve and Frances Howard are a middle-aged married couple unable to have children. They have discussed adoption but made no decision: the subject is clearly difficult for them. They have purchased a large detached house on a newly built luxury estate in Middlesex, England, and are starting to furnish and decorate it. Also to attend to the extensive, but empty, garden. She teaches English to GCE A-level students, he is a sales executive in an electrical appliance company, enjoying the regular driving his job entails.

Steve picks up a free-spirited teenage hitchhiker, Ella, and has a brief affair. To his considerable shock and surprise Ella turns up at his home whilst he is away and introduces herself to his wife Frances. After they become acquainted over several bottles of wine, she claims to be pregnant by another man, then begs to be allowed to stay for the weekend. Calculating and manipulative, when Steve returns and Frances is away Ella threatens to abort the baby, which she reveals is his. He begs her not to, but she refuses. Torn between his faltering love for his wife, his infatuation with Ella, and his unborn child, Steve finally agrees to leave his wife and set up home with Ella to have the baby together. Ella agrees, though without much enthusiasm, but specifies he should tell his wife when she (Ella) is not present.

Frances clearly suspects a secret relationship; her situation is further complicated by visits to her elderly mother Belle, an emotionally repressed women who reveals the philandering nature of Frances' father. And how she endured their lifetime of marriage, and his habit of bringing lady 'friends' to their home, by shutting her mind to it. Frances discloses somebody her husband met, a young girl, is now staying with them. Resignedly, her mother tells her 'You'll learn to live with it'.

Steve meets Frances to tell her of his decision, but before he can she - knowing what he is about to say, and telling him not to - says she wants to adopt Ella's unborn baby. This is a surprise opportunity - for Steve to save his marriage and have a child; likewise for Frances. But he rejects the offer and says he is leaving to live with Ella. "You bloody fool" she says, softly, as she leaves him. Frances fetches her mother to come and live in the house with her. Steve has arranged to meet Ella that evening, but she doesn't turn up. Returning to the house with her mother Frances finds Ella there. After shepherding the mother away, Ella tells Frances she is not now pregnant. Steve arrives, unaware of this latest development, and Ella tells him she has changed her mind. After tense exchanges Steve agrees to seek a divorce. Frances leaves with her mother to find a hotel. Steve packs a suitcase and leaves too. Ella is now seemingly in possession of the house, having in the meantime destroyed a marriage.

Cast
 Rod Steiger as Steve Howard
 Claire Bloom as Frances Howard
 Judy Geeson as Ella Patterson
 Peggy Ashcroft as Belle
 Paul Rogers as Jack Roberts
 Lynn Farleigh as Janet
 Elizabeth Spriggs as Marcia
 Sheila Allen as Beth

Production
The film was shot entirely on location in and around Camberley, England.

Reception

Box office
The film was the 19th most popular film at the UK box office in 1969.

U.S. television version
In 1970 a version of the film screened on NBC television in the U.S. Hall, O'Brien and Newman demanded their names be taken off the film, alleging 20 minutes of new footage had been shot and added.

References

External links

1969 films
1969 drama films
British drama films
Films about marriage
Films set in Manchester
Films shot in Hampshire
Films shot in Surrey
Films directed by Peter Hall
Films scored by Francis Lai
1960s English-language films
1960s British films